Söğütlü is a village in the Polateli District, Kilis Province, Turkey. It is inhabited by Turkmens of the Çavuşlu tribe and Kurds, and had a population of 83 in 2022. The Kurdish population migrated to the region from Besni.

References

Villages in Polateli District
Kurdish settlements in Kilis Province